Ram Prasad  or Ramprasad may refer to:
Ramprasad Sen, Shakta poet of eighteenth century Bengal
Ram Prasad Bismil, Indian revolutionary
Pyarelal Ramprasad Sharma, one of the duo music directors of Laxmikant-Pyarelal
Ram Prasad (cinematographer), director of photography from Telugu Film Industry
 Ram Prasad (politician), MLA for Sagwara (Rajasthan Assembly constituency) since 2018